Jim Dreyer (born August 16, 1963 in Grand Rapids, Michigan), also known as 'The Shark', is an ultra marathon athlete, because his swimming accomplishments are often tied to extensive running and cycling feats.

He has swum across various lakes, among others:
 Lake Michigan , in 1998
 Lake Huron  in 1999
 Lake Erie , as part of a duathlon in 2000
 Lake Ontario , as part of an "Ironman-distance plus" triathlon, in 2000
 Lake Michigan full length, est. , in 2003
 Lake Superior , in 2005

Dreyer has set various records on those distances and has won multiple marathon and triathlon awards. His swimming accomplishments have all been achieved with a wetsuit, and some swims have been done unaccompanied. These facts cause some dispute for establishing world marathon swimming records, as FINA, Channel swimming, and other marathon swimming rules do not allow unaccompanied or wetsuit swims to compete with standard swim records

On August 28, 2006, Dreyer began an attempt to set a record for the longest continuous swim in the open sea.  Dreyer plans to make an estimated 31 crossings totalling  of the Straits of Mackinac. Dubbed "Dire Straits 125", the feat is estimated to take 84 to 96 hours.

Through his swimming projects he tries to raise funds and awareness for the Big Brothers Big Sisters of America.

Jim is now living in Batesville, IN and successfully selling real estate.

1963 births
Living people
American male triathletes
American long-distance swimmers
American male swimmers